Marc Thompson (born June 27, 1953) is an American former cyclist. He competed in the team time trial event at the 1976 Summer Olympics. Marc won the 1974 edition of the Tour of Kansas City.

References

External links
 

1953 births
Living people
American male cyclists
Olympic cyclists of the United States
Cyclists at the 1976 Summer Olympics
Sportspeople from Kansas City, Missouri